Spaceflight in 1977 included some important events such as the roll out of the Space Shuttle orbiter, Voyager 1 and Voyager space probes were launched. NASA received the Space Shuttle orbiter later named , on 14 January. This unpowered sub-orbital space plane was launched off the top of a modified 747 and was flown uncrewed until 13 August until a human crew landed the Enterprise for the first time.

In August and September, the two Voyager spacecraft to the outer planets were launched. Voyager 2, launched on 20 August, went on to fly past Jupiter, Saturn, Uranus and Neptune. Voyager 1, which was launched on 5 September, flew past Jupiter and Saturn, with a planned flyby of Pluto being cancelled in favour of a closer flyby of Titan.

Launches

|}

Deep space rendezvous

EVAs

References

Footnotes

 
Spaceflight by year